A Tipler cylinder, also called a Tipler time machine, is a hypothetical object theorized to be a potential mode of time travel—although results have shown that a Tipler cylinder could only allow time travel if its length were infinite or with the existence of negative energy.

Discovery 
The Tipler cylinder was discovered as a solution to the equations of general relativity by Willem Jacob van Stockum in 1936 and Kornel Lanczos in 1924, but not recognized as allowing closed timelike curves until an analysis by Frank Tipler in 1974. Tipler showed in his 1974 paper, "Rotating Cylinders and the Possibility of Global Causality Violation" that in a spacetime containing a "...sufficiently large rotating cylinder..." which was spinning along its longitudinal axis, the cylinder should create a frame-dragging effect. This frame-dragging effect warps spacetime in such a way that the light cones of objects in the cylinder's proximity become tilted, so that part of the light cone then points backwards along the time axis on a spacetime diagram. Therefore, a spacecraft accelerating sufficiently in the appropriate direction can travel backwards through time along a closed timelike curve.

CTCs are associated, in Lorentzian manifolds which are interpreted physically as spacetimes, with the possibility of causal anomalies such as a person going back in time and potentially shooting their own grandfather, although paradoxes might be avoided using some constraint such as the Novikov self-consistency principle.  They appear in some of the most important exact solutions in general relativity, including the Kerr vacuum (which models a rotating black hole) and the van Stockum dust (which models a cylindrically symmetrical configuration of rotating pressureless fluid or dust).

Practicality 
An objection to the practicality of building a Tipler cylinder was discovered by Stephen Hawking, who argued that according to general relativity it is impossible to build a time machine in any finite region that satisfies the weak energy condition, meaning that the region contains no exotic matter with negative energy. The Tipler cylinder, on the other hand, does not involve any negative energy. Tipler's original solution involved a cylinder of infinite length, which is easier to analyze mathematically, and although Tipler suggested that a finite cylinder might produce closed timelike curves if the rotation rate were fast enough, he did not prove this. But Hawking comments "it can't be done with positive energy density everywhere! I can prove that to build a finite time machine, you need negative energy." Hawking's argument appears in his 1992 paper on the chronology protection conjecture (though the argument is distinct from the conjecture itself, since the argument asserts that classical general relativity predicts a finite region containing closed timelike curves can only be created if there is a violation of the weak energy condition in that region, whereas the conjecture predicts that closed timelike curves will prove to be impossible in a future theory of quantum gravity which replaces general relativity). In the paper, he examines "the case that the causality violations appear in a finite region of spacetime without curvature singularities" and proves that "[t]here will be a Cauchy horizon that is compactly generated and that in general contains one or more closed null geodesics which will be incomplete. One can define geometrical quantities that measure the Lorentz boost and area increase on going round these closed null geodesics. If the causality violation developed from a noncompact initial surface, the averaged weak energy condition must be violated on the Cauchy horizon."

In fiction 
 Steins;Gate is a visual novel which mentions Tipler cylinders with the topic of time travel and John Titor.
 John DeChancie's Starrigger series uses vertically-aligned Tipler cylinders (called Kerr–Tipler objects) to create spacetime gateways along an intergalactic highway.
 Larry Niven's short story, "Rotating Cylinders and the Possibility of Global Causality Violation", borrows its title from Tipler's paper.
 Poul Anderson includes it in his novel The Avatar.
 Vernor Vinge in the novel Marooned in Realtime (although the object is described as being a naked black hole).
 Kris Straub's Starslip comic includes a Tipler cylinder created as a work of art (comic 569), which also causes time travel.
Ian Douglas has a Tipler cylinder created by aliens of unknown origin in Singularity, the third book of the Star Carrier series.
Star Trek Online uses a device by the same name which enables the player to reverse time several (up to 7~13 secs.) seconds within a localised field. (The specificity of thirteen seconds of time reversal, along with the device having a beryllium core, are references to the science fiction comedy Galaxy Quest.)
 In his Warstrider series of novels, William H. Keith uses a Tipler cylinder with a length-to-width ratio of 512 that allows travel to and from the core of the Milky Way galaxy.
 In Terry Pratchett's Discworld series, the "procrastinators" used by the History Monks are considered to be a type of Tipler cylinder.
 The greens, a race of parasite aliens, tried to build a Tipler cylinder in the Lifeline mobile game series. This is explained in the Halfway To Infinity game.
 A Tipler cylinder is used as a plot device in Chuck Grossart's story "The Phoenix Descent".
 Episode 9 of the webseries Ask Weathersby mentions the Tipler cylinder, discussing time travel.
 In "The Miracle of Christmas", Episode 2.11 of the American TV series Timeless, a Tipler cylinder is mentioned as being added to an upgraded time machine.
 In season 2 episode 14 of "Gabby Duran & the Unsittables - Zeke to the Future" a Tipler's Infinity Cylinder is mentioned as a possible time travel device.
 In "Doctor Who", in the opening scene, his time-travelling Tardis is making its way through something most think to be a 'wormhole', but is actually, unbeknownst to most, a Tipler cylinder.

References 
Notes

Bibliography

 Frank Jennings Tipler, Causality Violation in General Relativity, Ph.D. thesis at the University of Maryland, College Park (1976). Source: Dissertation Abstracts International, Vol. 37–06, Section B, pg. 2923. Also available as Dissertation 76–29,018 from Xerox University Microfilms, Ann Arbor, MI.
 Penrose, Roger. "The Question of Cosmic Censorship." Journal of Astrophysics and Astronomy Vol. 20 (September, 1999): 233.
 Wald, Robert (ed). Black Holes and Relativistic Stars. University of Chicago Press, 1998. 

Megastructures
Physics in fiction
Time travel devices